Zaykovka is a rural locality (a selo) in Baybeksky Selsoviet, Krasnoyarsky District, Astrakhan Oblast, Russia. The population was 64 as of 2010. There is 1 street.

Geography 
Zaykovka is located 9 km north of Krasny Yar (the district's administrative centre) by road. Pereprava Korsaka and Alcha are the nearest rural localities.

References 

Rural localities in Krasnoyarsky District, Astrakhan Oblast